All About Her may refer to:

"All About Her" a 2001 song by Cheb Khaled / Chaba Zahouania
"All About Her" a 2000 song by New Found Glory from New Found Glory
"All About Her", a 2018 song by Paul Brandt from The Journey YYC, Vol. 1
"All About Her" a 1966 song by Paul Revere & the Raiders from The Spirit of '67